Anatoli Buyalski is a Belarusian basketball coach. He coached the Belarusian national team at the 2016 Summer Olympics, where the team finished ninth.

References

Year of birth missing (living people)
Living people
Basketball coaches
Belarusian sportspeople